Fides or FIDES may refer to:

Faith, trust, loyalty, or fidelity, or a religious belief
Fides (cycling team), an Italian professional cycling team in 1961
Fides (deity), goddess of trust in Roman mythology
Fides (reliability), guide allowing estimated reliability calculation in electronics
Fides (name), given name
37 Fides, asteroid in the main belt of Earth's Solar System
Uberrima fides, legal doctrine governing insurance contracts
Agenzia Fides, news agency of the Vatican
FIDES Bank Namibia, a commercial bank
Fonds d'Investissements pour le Developpement Economique et Social, former government agency of colonial-era France
Sky Fides, a Czech paraglider design

See also

 Bona fide (disambiguation)
 Fidei (disambiguation)
 Fide (disambiguation)